The 2020–21 Coupe de France preliminary rounds, Centre-Val de Loire was the qualifying competition to decide which teams from the leagues of the Centre-Val de Loire region of France took part in the main competition from the seventh round.

A total of four teams qualified from the Centre-Val de Loire Preliminary rounds. In 2019–20, Saint-Pryvé Saint-Hilaire FC progressed furthest in the main competition, reaching the round of 32 before losing to Monaco 1–3.

Schedule
A total of 256 teams entered from the region. The draw required a Preliminary round involving 178 clubs from the district divisions and Régional 3 on 30 August 2020. The 59 clubs from the regional division (other than those Régional 3 clubs already entered) entered at the first round stage on 6 September 2020. The draw for the preliminary, first and second rounds was made on 21 July 2020.

The third round draw, which saw the entry of the Championnat National 3 clubs, was made on 10 September 2020. The fourth round draw, which saw the entry of the Championnat National 2 clubs, was made on 24 September 2020. The fifth round draw, which saw the single Championnat National side from the region enter the competition, was made on 8 October 2020. The sixth round draw was made on 20 October 2020.

Preliminary round
These matches were played on 29 and 30 August 2020, with one postponed until 3 September 2020.

First round
These matches were played on 5 and 6 September 2020.

Second round
These matches were played on 13 September 2020, with one replayed on 27 September 2020.

Third round
These matches were played on 19 and 20 September 2020, with one postponed until 30 September 2020 due to awaiting the outcome of the previous round.

Fourth round
These matches were played on 3 and 4 October 2020.

Fifth round
These matches were played on 17 and 18 October 2020, with one postponed until 28 October 2020.

Sixth round
These matches were played on 31 January 2021.

References

Preliminary rounds